The diplomatic post of United States Ambassador to Croatia was created on April 7, 1992, following Croatia's independence from SFR Yugoslavia and its recognition as an independent state by the United States, although official presence of the US in Croatia began with the establishment of the US Consulate in Zagreb on May 9, 1946.

See also
Embassy of Croatia, Washington, D.C.
Croatia – United States relations
Foreign relations of Croatia
Ambassadors of the United States

References

United States Department of State: Background notes on Croatia

External links
 United States Department of State: Chiefs of Mission for Croatia
 United States Department of State: Croatia
 United States Embassy in Zagreb

Croatia

United States